

Historical or architectural interest bridges

Major bridges

References 
 Nicolas Janberg, Structurae.com, International Database for Civil and Structural Engineering

 Others references

See also 

 Ghana Road Network
 Transport in Ghana
 Rail transport in Ghana

Ghana

b
Bridges